The Constituent Assembly, is a term describing one of the three methods by which amendments to the 1987 Constitution of the Philippines may be proposed. The other two modes are via People's Initiative and Constitutional Convention. All three require a majority vote in a national referendum.

Constituent Assembly is composed of all members of the bicameral Congress of the Philippines (Senate and the House of Representatives). It is convened by Congress to propose amendments to the 1987 constitution. Under Article XVII of the Constitution of the Philippines, amendments pass upon a vote of three fourths of all members of Congress, wherein the Congress votes as separate houses for the amendment. The convention of Congress into the term "Constituent Assembly" is not explicitly provided for in the Constitution, since the term is not used in the Constitution with it being only referred to as "Congress upon a vote of three-fourths of all its members".

See also
 Constitutional reform in the Philippines
 Constitution of the Philippines

References

Bibliography

External links
 Abs-Cbn Interactive, New people's initiative drive eyes revision, not amendment
 Con-ass provokes criticisms, rallies, prayers
 Con-ass sparks outrage, Resolution is prelude to ‘parliamentary elections’
 Nograles urges SC to rule on Con-ass due to protests

Political organizations based in the Philippines